Gary G. Lynch is an American attorney and the former chief legal officer for the New York City investment bank Morgan Stanley. He was formerly Vice Chairman of the Firm, resident in its London Office.

In April, 2011, Bank of America named him global chief of legal, compliance and regulatory relations, a new position created at BoA to deal with its on-going mortgage woes arising from its acquisition of Countrywide Financial, the subprime lender it acquired in 2008, once the nation's largest mortgage lender. http://dealbook.nytimes.com/2011/04/15/mortgage-woes-stall-bank-of-americas-revival/?ref=todayspaper

Lynch graduated Phi Beta Kappa from Syracuse University in 1972 and received his J.D. degree from Duke University School of Law in 1975. From 1985 to 1989, Lynch served as Chief of the Enforcement Division of the Securities & Exchange Commission. While there he brought cases, and obtained settlements, against Dennis Levine, Ivan Boesky and Michael Milken. In 1989 he negotiated a $650 million settlement with Drexel Burnham Lambert which was, at that time, the largest fine under securities laws.

In 1989, Lynch joined the law firm of Davis Polk & Wardwell as a partner. He represented clients on SEC issues, including defending them on enforcement matters. While at Davis Polk, he often was brought in by companies to conduct independent investigations into possible wrongdoings.

Lynch joined Credit Suisse First Boston as Global General Counsel in October 2001 and later became Vice Chairman. At Credit Suisse Lynch worked to restore the company's legal reputation by reaching agreements with regulators. In October 2005 Lynch was hired at Morgan Stanley by their then CEO John J. Mack, whom he had previously worked for at Credit Suisse.

References

Further reading
Biography Index. A cumulative index to biographical material in books and magazines. Volume 14: September, 1984-August, 1986. New York: H.W. Wilson Co., 1986. (BioIn 14)
Biography Index. A cumulative index to biographical material in books and magazines. Volume 15: September, 1986-August, 1988. New York: H.W. Wilson Co., 1988. (BioIn 15)
Biography Index. A cumulative index to biographical material in books and magazines. Volume 28: September, 2002-August, 2003. New York: H.W. Wilson Co., 2003. (BioIn 28)
The New York Times Biographical Service. A compilation of current biographical information of general interest. Volume 16, Numbers 1- 12. Ann Arbor, MI: University Microfilms International, 1985. Use the annual Index to locate biographies. (NewYTBS 16) Biography contains portrait.

Living people
American lawyers
Duke University School of Law alumni
Syracuse University alumni
Davis Polk & Wardwell lawyers
Year of birth missing (living people)